Dronework is an EP by Bass Communion, one of Steven Wilson's side projects. It consist of single title track. The CD-R was originally available as part of the Twenty Hertz Droneworks series as Drone Works #6. It was withdrawn in December 2004 and reissued on Wilson's own label, Headphone Dust in March 2005. The album was reissued again in July 2008 as a factory pressed CD through Headphone Dust, on compact cassette through Coup Sur Coup Records, and on vinyl through Tonefloat.

Track listing

Release history

References

2005 EPs
Bass Communion albums
Coup Sur Coup Records albums